Ak-Tam is a village in Jalal-Abad Region of Kyrgyzstan. It is part of the Ala-Buka District. Its population was 5,404 in 2021.

Population

References
 

Populated places in Jalal-Abad Region